Imperial Tula Arms Plant is a Russian weapons manufacturer founded by Tsar Peter I of Russia in 1712 in Tula, Tula Oblast as Tula Arsenal. Throughout its history, it has produced weapons for the Russian state. Its name was changed from Tula Arsenal to Tula Arms Plant during the Soviet era.

History of the plant

Historically, the plant produced a wide variety of sports weapons and arms for the Imperial Russian Army.

18th century

In the 18th century, Tula Arms Plant was recognized as setting the standard for Russian Arms Production.

19th and early 20th century

Reconstructed in the 19th century Tula Arms Factory became one of the most prominent arms factories in Europe.

In 1910 the factory started production of the Maxim machine gun.

In 1927 planning and design office was established in order to improve the work of all of the plant's designers, the result of which was the development of aircraft machine guns - PV-1 and ShKAS. Between 1927 and 1938 the plant built the country's first spinning machines.

Importance during World War II

During World War II, Axis countries invaded USSR as part of Operation Barbarossa. By December 5, 1941, the German 2nd Panzer Division had advanced to within a few kilometers of Tula, forcing the Soviets to evacuate Tula Arms Plant. As a result, far fewer weapons were produced there than at other Soviet factories such as Izhevsk Mechanical Plant. 

In 1941-1945, working under the slogan "Everything for the front, everything for victory", Tula gunsmiths produced Mosin–Nagant 91/30 rifles, SVT-40 self-loading rifles, ShVAK aircraft guns, Nagant revolvers and Tokarev pistols.

Cold War

Tula was strategically important to the Soviet Union during the Cold War. Significant ore deposits were situated relatively close to it and it had access to ample transportation routes like the Upa River and many rail lines coming in and out of the city.

In 1965 constructors N. I. Korovyakov and V.P. Ochneva created a reliable double-barreled over-and-under shotgun TOZ-34.

During 1960s–1980s, the plant received an order for production of the world-famous Kalashnikov assault rifles (six variants), anti-tank guided missiles - 9M14 Malyutka, 9M133 Kornet, 9M113 Konkurs and the Bonfire underslung grenade launcher.

Products

During the early to mid-Soviet era, Tula Arms Plant produced a variety military rifles, including the Mosin–Nagant, SVT-40, SKS, and AKM. It also produced the Nagant M1895 revolver.

From the late 1970s to the early 1980s, the factory produced the AK-74, and went on to manufacture the VSS Vintorez, AS Val, OTs-14 Groza, and TOZ rifle weapons designed by TsNIITochMash. The plant also produces large quantities of small arms ammunition for the military as well as for commercial sale.

The factory has also manufactured a number of pistols over the years such as the Korovin pistol, TT pistol, Stechkin automatic pistol, SPP-1 underwater pistol, and MSP Groza silent pistol.

Notable products

Knives

NRS-2

Pistols

SPP-1 underwater pistol
TKB-506

Shotguns

TOZ-25
TOZ-28
TOZ-34
TOZ-54
TOZ-63
TOZ-66
TOZ-106
TOZ-194
TOZ-250
TOZ-MTs 21-12
TOZ-87

Rifles

APS underwater rifle
AS Val
ASM-DT amphibious rifle
SR-3 Vikhr
SVT-40
TKB-010
TKB-059
TKB-072
TKB-517
TOZ rifle
VSS Vintorez

See also

KBP Instrument Design Bureau
Barnaul Cartridge Plant
Wolf Ammunition
Red Army Standard Ammunition

References

External links

Official Site
European AK factories
Tula Arsenal
Sales site

Defence companies of the Soviet Union
High Precision Systems
Ammunition manufacturers
Companies based in Tula Oblast
1712 establishments in Russia
Russian brands
Firearm manufacturers of Russia